Casole Bruzio is a town in the province of Cosenza in the Calabria region of southern Italy. It was a comune until 2017, when after a referendum it became a frazione of the newly formed Casali del Manco along with four other municipalities.

References

Cities and towns in Calabria